Khanim Huseynova (born 1 March 1993) is an Azerbaijani Paralympic judoka. She won the gold medal in the women's 63 kg event at the 2020 Summer Paralympics held in Tokyo, Japan.

Personal life
Khanim is the sister of Azerbaijani judoka, paralympic gold medalists Dursadaf Karimova.

References

External links

 

Living people
1993 births
Azerbaijani female judoka
Paralympic judoka of Azerbaijan
Paralympic gold medalists for Azerbaijan
Paralympic medalists in judo
Judoka at the 2020 Summer Paralympics
Medalists at the 2020 Summer Paralympics
Place of birth missing (living people)
European Games competitors for Azerbaijan
Judoka at the 2015 European Games
21st-century Azerbaijani women